{{Infobox organization
| image               = Kerala Sahitya Akademy.JPG
| motto               = 
| formation           = 1956
| type                = Literary Organisation
| headquarters        = Thrissur, Kerala, 
| language            = Malayalam
| leader_title        = Patron
| leader_name         = Pinarayi Vijayan
| leader_title2       = President
| leader_name2        = K. Satchidanandan
| leader_name3        = C.P. Aboobacker
| leader_title3       = Secretary
| leader_title4       = Board Members
| leader_name4        =
| name                = കേരള സാഹിത്യ അക്കാദമിKerala Sahitya Akademi| num_volunteers      = 
| website             = 
}}

The Kerala Sahitya Akademi or Academy for Malayalam literature' is an autonomous body established to promote the Malayalam language and literature. It is situated in the city of Thrissur, Kerala in India.

History
The academy was inaugurated on 15 October 1956, by Chithira Thirunal Balarama Varma, the former king of Travancore, in Thiruvananthapuram. It was shifted to its present location at City of Thrissur in September, 1957.  Though the Kerala Government provides the funding and support for the academy, the administration of the academy is autonomous according to its constitution. The academy recognises superior literary works through its annual literary awards for Poetry, Novel, Story, Drama, Literary criticism, Biography – autobiography, Travelogue, Humour, Translation, Children's literature etc..  the academy is headed by Malayalam short story writer Vaisakhan, who is serving as its president, Khadija Mumtaz as its vice president, and K P Mohanan as its secretary.

Kerala Sahitya Akademi Award

The Akademi instituted the Kerala Sahitya Akademi Award in 1958. It is given annually to Malayalam writers for their outstanding books of literary merit. The awards are given in various categories.

Activities

The Academy  has one of the best libraries in Kerala. It is an approved doctoral research centre for the universities in Kerala. The Akademi also holds periodic book festivals to encourage reading among the masses. The Akademi has a picture gallery of writers of yester years. The Akademi regularly publishes three  journals Sahithyalokam, Sahithya Chakravalam and Malayalam Literary Survey (in English). Besides the Kerala Sahitya Akademi Award, the Akademi awards the illustrious  Ezhuthachan Puraskaram'', which is named after the father of Malayalam literature Thunchaththu Ezhuthachan, yearly to prominent  literary figures.

See also
 Sahitya Akademi

References

External links

Kerala Sahitya Academy
 Kerala Sahitya Academy: Governing Body
Sahitya Akademy : India's National Academy of Letters

 
Culture of Kerala
Malayalam language
Indic literature societies
Organisations based in Thrissur
Non-profit organisations based in India
Language regulators
1956 establishments in Kerala
Organizations established in 1956